Rudasht-e Sharqi Rural District is a rural district (dehestan) in Bon Rud District, Isfahan County, Isfahan Province, Iran. At the 2006 census, its population was 7,946, in 2,193 families.  The rural district has 7 villages.

References 

Rural Districts of Isfahan Province
Isfahan County